is a male freestyle wrestler from Japan.

External links
 bio on fila-wrestling.com

Living people
1985 births
Japanese male sport wrestlers
Asian Games medalists in wrestling
Wrestlers at the 2010 Asian Games
World Wrestling Championships medalists
Asian Games bronze medalists for Japan
Medalists at the 2010 Asian Games
21st-century Japanese people